Ray Haddington (1923 – 1994) was a footballer who played as an inside forward in the Football League for Oldham Athletic, Manchester City, Stockport County, Bournemouth, Rochdale and Halifax Town.

References

1923 births
1994 deaths
Footballers from Bradford
Association football inside forwards
English footballers
Bradford (Park Avenue) A.F.C. players
Bradford City A.F.C. players
Oldham Athletic A.F.C. players
Manchester City F.C. players
Stockport County F.C. players
AFC Bournemouth players
Rochdale A.F.C. players
Halifax Town A.F.C. players
Bedford Town F.C. players
English Football League players